The Kadavu Group is an archipelago south of Viti Levu, one of Fiji's two main islands. Dominated by Kadavu Island, the fourth largest island in Fiji, the group also includes Ono, Dravuni, Galoa and a number of islets in the Great Astrolabe Reef.

Kadavu Group - satellite view

 
Archipelagoes of Fiji
Archipelagoes of the Pacific Ocean